Deutsche Bank S.p.A. is an Italian bank based in Milan, Lombardy. It is a subsidiary of Deutsche Bank A.G..

History

Banca dell'Italia Meridionale was found in 1917. It was acquired by Amadeo Giannini, the founder of Bank of Italy (United States) in 1922. The bank was renamed to Banca d'America e d'Italia (literally the Bank of America and Italy). In December 1986 Deutsche Bank acquired 98.3% voting rights of the bank. In 1994 the bank was renamed to Deutsche Bank S.p.A..

In 1994 the DB Italy also acquired Banca Popolare di Lecco. In 1999 DB Italy acquired 20% shares of Cassa di Risparmio di Asti which was sold to Banca Popolare di Milano in 2004. From 2000 to 2003 the bank also had a minority interests in Banca di Cividale.

References

External links

 

Banks of Italy
Companies based in Milan
Banks established in 1917
Italian companies established in 1917
Deutsche Bank